The 11th Fighter Wing is a disbanded United States Army Air Forces organization. Its last assignment was with Eighth Air Force at Drew Field, Florida. It was constituted in late  and disbanded in late .

History
The wing was constituted in late 1940 at Hamilton Field, California in the buildup of the United States Army Air Corps in response to the start of World War II in Europe. It moved to Army Air Base, Portland in 1941, where it assumed responsibility for organizing two pursuit groups. It was inactivated later that year, and its personnel used as part of the cadre for headquarters units of Fourth Air Force.

The wing was activated the following year at Drew Field, Florida. Although it was programmed for overseas deployment to the European theater and was assigned to Eighth Air Force, it was attached to Third Air Force for training. It was never assigned any combat groups and was inactivated before deploying overseas.

In 1985 the wing was reconstituted on paper as the 367th Electronic Warfare Group, but was never active before being disbanded again in 1992.

Lineage
 Constituted as the 11th Pursuit Wing on 19 October 1940
 Activated on 18 December 1940
 Inactivated on 2 October 1941
 Redesignated 11th Fighter Wing in October 1942
 Activated on 1 November 1942
 Inactivated on 1 May 1943
 Disbanded on 1 December 1943
 Reconstituted on 31 July 1985 and redesignated 367th Electronic Warfare Group (not active)
 Disbanded on 9 September 1992

Assignments
 Northwest Air District 18 December 1940 – 2 October 1941
 Eighth Air Force, 1 November 1942 – 1 May 1943 (attached to Third Air Force)

Stations
 Hamilton Field, California, 18 December 1940
 Army Air Base, Portland, Oregon, June 1941 – 2 October 1941
 Drew Field, Florida, 1 November 1942 – 1 May 1943

Components
 54th Fighter Group, 1941 – 2 October 1941
 55th Fighter Group, 1941 – 2 October 1941

Aircraft
 Curtiss P-36 Hawk, 1941
 Lockheed P-38 Lightning, 1941
 Curtiss P-40 Warhawk, 1941
 Republic P-43 Lancer, 1941

References

Notes

Bibliography

 

Further reading
 

011
Military units and formations disestablished in 1943